The Sidoarjo mud flow (commonly known as Lumpur Lapindo, wherein lumpur is the Indonesian word for mud) is the result of an erupting mud volcano in the subdistrict of Porong, Sidoarjo in East Java, Indonesia that has been in eruption since May 2006. It is the biggest mud volcano in the world; responsibility for the disaster was assigned to the blowout of a natural gas well drilled by PT Lapindo Brantas, although company officials contend it was caused by a very distant earthquake that occurred in a different province.

It is expected that the flow will continue for the next 25 to 30 years. Although the Sidoarjo mud flow has been contained by levees since November 2008, resultant floodings regularly disrupt local highways and villages, and further breakouts of mud are still possible.

Geological setting
Mud volcano systems are fairly common on Earth, and particularly in the Indonesian province of East Java. Beneath the island of Java is a half-graben lying in the east–west direction, filled with over-pressured marine carbonates and marine muds. It forms an inverted extensional basin which has been geologically active since the Paleogene epoch. The basin started to become overpressured during the Oligo-Miocene period.

The East Java Basin contains a significant amount of oil and gas reserves, therefore the region is known as a major concession area for mineral exploration. The Porong subdistrict, 14 km south of Sidoarjo city, is known in the mineral industry as the Brantas Production Sharing Contract (PSC), an area of approximately 7,250 km2 which consists of three oil and gas fields: Wunut, Carat and Tanggulangin. As of 2006, three companies—Santos (18%), MedcoEnergi (32%) and PT Lapindo Brantas (50%)—had concession rights for this area; PT Lapindo Brantas acted as an operator.

Chronology
On May 28, 2006, PT Lapindo Brantas targeted gas in the Kujung Formation carbonates in the Brantas PSC area by drilling a borehole named the 'Banjar-Panji 1 exploration well'. In the first stage of drilling the drill string first went through a thick clay seam (500–1,300 m deep), then through sands, shales, volcanic debris and finally into permeable carbonate rocks. The Banjar Panji-1 borehole was cased down to 1,091 m (3,579 ft). At 5:00 a.m. local time (UTC+7) on the 29th of May 2006, after the well had reached a total depth of 2,834 m (9,298 ft), this time without a protective casing, water, steam and a small amount of gas erupted at a location about 200 m southwest of the well. Two further eruptions occurred on the second and the third of June about 800–1,000 m northwest of the well, but these stopped on June 5, 2006.

A magnitude 6.3 earthquake occurred in Yogyakarta at ~06:00 local time 27 May 2006, approximately  Southwest of Sidoarjo. It has been suggested that a small (20 barrel) mud loss occurred in the Banjar Panji-1 well seven minutes after the Yogyakarta earthquake (consistent with the time taken for the earthquake seismic waves to reach the Lusi location), though there is no clear report of these losses in the drilling data, and it has also been alternatively reported that these losses occurred one hour before the earthquake. The well suffered a complete loss of circulation at 12:50 p.m. local time on the 26th May 2006, which was between 1.5 and 4.75 hours after three large aftershocks. A loss of circulation happens when drilling mud—necessary for maintenance of wellbore stability—that is pumped down a shaft does not return to the surface but is lost into some opening or a fault system. This mud loss problem was finally stopped when loss circulation material was pumped into the well, a standard practice in drilling an oil and gas well. A day later the well suffered a ‘kick’, an influx of formation fluid into the well bore. The kick was reported by Lapindo Brantas drilling engineers as having been killed within three hours, though alternative interpretations of drilling records, specifically ongoing fluctuations in downhole drillpipe pressure, indicate that the kick continued for at least 24 hours. Dense drilling mud and cement were pumped down the Banjar Panji-1 well at various times in the 48 hours after the mud flow started, in an attempt to kill the surface mud eruption. Lapindo Brantas daily drilling records state that "bubbles intensity reduced and elapse time between each bubble is longer" after pumping dense drilling mud down the well, indicating direct communication between Banjar Panji-1 and the Sidoarjo mudflow. A detailed review of the timing of key events in the drilling of Banjar Panji-1 and the first days of the Sidoarjo mudflow can be found in reference.

Possible causes 
The birth of Lusi was a major disaster for the population living nearby, with loss of their houses, properties and their livelihood. For the scientific community, however, it was a chance to study the evolving geological process of a mud volcano. In the past, mud vulcanologists could only study existing or ancient mud volcanoes during dormant periods. Thus, Lusi is a rare occasion and a unique opportunity to conduct scientific experiments to further our understanding. It also offers opportunities to study the down hole condition of a mud volcano from the neighboring Banjar-Panji exploration well lithologies.

To explain what triggered the mud volcano, three hypotheses have been suggested, though none has won universal support:

 Drilling-induced fracturing or fault reactivation (reflecting a man-made event)
 Earthquake-triggered fault reactivation (reflecting a natural event)
 Geothermal processes (reflecting geothermal heating)

Drilling-induced fracturing
From a model developed by geologists working in the UK, the drilling pipe penetrated the overpressured limestone, causing entrainment of mud by water. Whilst pulling the drill string out of the well, there were ongoing losses of drilling mud, as demonstrated by the daily drilling reports stating "overpull increasing", "only 50% returns" and "unable to keep hole full". The loss of drilling mud and associated drop in downhole mud weight eventually resulted in a drilling kick, with over 365 barrels of fluid erupting at the Banjar Panji-1 wellhead. Blowout preventers were closed to help kill the kick, which resulted in a spike in downhole pressure within the wellbore. The drilling-induced triggering model proposes that the increase in pressure within the wellbore was sufficiently high to induce a large hydraulic fracture in the formation. The extra pressure caused the hydraulic fractures to propagate 1–2 km to the surface and emerged 200 m away from the well. The lack of protective casing in the bottom 1742m of the borehole is considered a key reason why the drilling kick could not be controlled and why pressures during the kick were high enough to initiate hydraulic fracturing. Alternatively, it has also been suggested that the increased fluid pressure in the borehole, due to the kick, may have triggered reactivation of a nearby fault system, rather than hydraulic fracturing (in a similar manner to how fluid injection can induce seismicity). Though steel casing is used to protect the well bore in oil or gas exploration, this can only be applied in stages after each new section of the hole is drilled; see drilling for oil.

Their analysis suggests that the well has a low resistance to a kick. Similarly, a NE-SW crack in the surface in the drill site may be evidence of an underground blowout. The well may have suffered an underground blowout that resulted in a surface breach.

Earthquake-induced fault reactivation 
The relatively close timing of the Yogyakarta earthquake, the problems of mud loss and kick in the well and the birth of the mud volcano continue to interest geoscientists. Was the mud volcano due to the same seismic event that triggered the earthquake? Geoscientists from Norway, Russia, France and Indonesia have suggested that the shaking caused by the Yogyakarta earthquake may have induced liquefaction of the underlying Kalibeng clay layer, releasing gases and causing a pressure change large enough to reactivate a major fault nearby (the Watukosek fault), creating a mud flow path that caused Lusi.

They have identified more than 10 naturally triggered mud volcanoes in the East Java province, with at least five near the Watukosek fault system, confirming that the region is prone to mud volcanism. They also showed that surface cracks surrounding Lusi predominantly run NE-SW, the direction of the Watukosek fault. Increased seep activity in the mud volcanoes along the Watukosek fault coincided with the May 27, 2006 seismic event. A major fault system may have been reactivated, resulting in the formation of a mud volcano.

Geothermal process 
Lusi is near the arc of volcanoes in Indonesia where geothermal activities are abundant. The nearest volcano, the Arjuno-Welirang complex, is less than 15 km away. The hot mud suggests that some form of geothermal heating from the nearby magmatic volcano may have been involved. The hot water and steam flowing from the vent, the location of Lusi near a magmatic volcano complex and its recharge system indicates that Lusi may be a geothermal phenomenon.

Investigations

Cause

There was controversy as to what triggered the eruption and whether the event was a natural disaster or not. According to PT Lapindo Brantas it was the 2006 Yogyakarta earthquake that triggered the mud flow eruption, and not their drilling activities.
Two days before the mud eruption, an earthquake of moment magnitude 6.3 hit the south coast of Central Java and Yogyakarta provinces killing 6,234 people and leaving 1.5 million homeless. At a hearing before the parliamentary members, senior executives of PT Lapindo Brantas argued that the earthquake was so powerful that it had reactivated previously inactive faults and also creating deep underground fractures, allowing the mud to breach the surface, and that their company presence was coincidental, which should exempt them from paying compensation damage to the victims. If the cause of the incident is determined to be natural, then the government of Indonesia has the responsibility to cover the damage instead. This argument was also recurrently echoed by Aburizal Bakrie, the Indonesian Minister of Welfare at that time, whose family firm controls the operator company PT Lapindo Brantas.

However the UK team of geologists downplayed Lapindo's argument and concluded "...that the earthquake that occurred two days earlier is coincidental." The intensity of the earthquake at the drilling site was estimated to have been only magnitude 2 on Richter scale, the same effect as a heavy truck passing over the area.

In June 2008, a report released by British, American, Indonesian, and Australian scientists, concluded that the volcano was not a natural disaster, but the result of oil and gas drilling.

Legal case

On June 5, 2006, MedcoEnergi (one partner company in the Brantas PSC area) sent a letter to PT Lapindo Brantas accusing them of breaching safety procedures during the drilling process. The letter further attributes "gross negligence" to the operator company for not equipping the well bore with steel safety encasing. Soon afterwards then-vice president Jusuf Kalla announced that PT Lapindo Brantas and the owner, the Bakrie Group, would have to compensate thousands of victims affected by the mud flows. Criminal investigations were then initiated against several senior executives of the company because the drilling operation had put the lives of local people at risk.

Aburizal Bakrie frequently said that he is not involved in the company's operation and further distanced himself from the incident. Even in his capacity as Minister of Welfare, Aburizal Bakrie was reluctant to visit the disaster site. Aburizal Bakrie's family business group, Bakrie Group, one of the owners of PT Lapindo Brantas, had been trying to distance themselves from the Lusi incident. Afraid of being held liable for the disaster, Bakrie Group announced that they would sell PT Lapindo Brantas to an offshore company for only $2, but  blocked the sale. A further attempt was made to try to sell to a company registered in the Virgin Islands, the Freehold Group, for US$1 million, which was also halted by the government supervisory agency for being an invalid sale. Lapindo Brantas was asked to pay about 2.5 trillion rupiah (about US$276.8 million) to the victims and about 1.3 trillion rupiah as additional costs to stop the flow. Some analysts predict that the Bakrie Group will pursue bankruptcy to avoid the cost of cleanup, which could amount to US$1 billion.

On August 15, 2006, the East Java police seized the Banjar-Panji 1 well to secure it for the court case. The Indonesian environmental watchdog, WALHI, meanwhile had filed a lawsuit against PT Lapindo Brantas, President Susilo Bambang Yudhoyono, the Indonesian Minister of Energy, the Indonesian Minister of Environmental Affairs and local officials.

After investigations by independent experts, police had concluded the mud flow was an "underground blow out", triggered by the drilling activity. It is further noted that steel encasing lining had not been used which could have prevented the disaster. Thirteen Lapindo Brantas' executives and engineers face twelve charges of violating Indonesian laws.

Artistic
Australian artist Susan Norrie investigated the political and ecological meaning of event in a sixteen-screen video installation at the 2007 Venice Biennale.

Current status

2008 

By mid August 2011, mud was being discharged at a rate of 10,000 m3 per day, with 15 bubbles around its gushing point.

One study found that the mud volcano was collapsing under its own weight, possibly beginning caldera formation. The researchers said the subsidence data could help determine how much of the local area will be affected by Lusi. They proposed that the subsidence was due to the weight of mud and collapse of rock strata due to the excavation of mud from beneath the surface. Their study also found that while some parts of Sidoarjo were subsiding, others were rising suggesting that the Watukosek fault system had been reactivated because of the eruption.

A study by a group of Indonesian geo-scientists led by Bambang Istadi predicted the area affected by the mudflow over a ten-year period. The model simulated the mud flow and its likely outcome in order to find safe locations to relocate people and affected infrastructures.

After new hot gas flows began to appear, workers started relocating families and some were injured in the process. The workers were taken to a local hospital to undergo treatment for severe burns. In Siring Barat, 319 more families were displaced and in Kelurahan Jatirejo, 262 new families were expected to be affected by the new flows of gas. Protesting families took to the streets demanding compensation which in turn added more delays to the already stressed detour road for Jalan Raya Porong and the Porong-Gempol toll road.

The Indonesian government has stated that their heart is with the people.  However the cabinet meeting on how to disburse compensation has been delayed until further notice. A local official Saiful Ilah signed a statement announcing that, "The government is going to defend the people of Siring." Following this announcement protests came to an end and traffic flow returned to normal an hour later.

Stakeholder exit 
The Australian oil and gas company Santos Limited was a minority partner in the venture until 2008. In December 2008, the company sold its 18% stake in the project to Minarak Labuan, the owner of Lapindo Brantas Inc. Labuan also received a payment from Santos of $US22.5 million ($A33.9 million) "to support long-term mud management efforts". The amount was covered by existing provision for costs relating to the incident. Santos had provisioned for $US79 million ($A119.3 million) in costs associated with the disaster. Santos had stated in June 2006 that it maintained "appropriate insurance coverage for these types of occurrences".

2010 
New mudflows spots begun in April 2010, this time on Porong Highway, which is the main road linking Surabaya with Probolinggo and islands to the east including Bali, despite roadway thickening and strengthening. A new highway is planned to replace this one however are held up by land acquisition issues. The main railway also runs by the area, which is in danger of explosions due to seepage of methane and ignition could come from something as simple as a tossed cigarette.

As of June 2009, the residents had received less than 20% of the suggested compensation. By mid-2010, reimbursement payments for victims had not been fully settled, and legal action against the company had stalled. It is worth mentioning that the owner of the energy company, Aburizal Bakrie was the Coordinating Minister for People's Welfare at the time of the disaster, and is currently the chairman of Golkar, one of the most influential political parties in Indonesia.

2011 
In 2011, Lapindo Brantas published an independent Social Impact Report.

The Sidoarjo mud is rich in rock salt (halite) and has provided a source of income for the local residents who have been harvesting the salt for sale at the local market.

2013 
In late 2013, international scientists who had been monitoring the situation were reported as saying that the eruption of mud at Sidoardjo was falling away quite rapidly and that the indications were that the eruption might cease by perhaps 2017, much earlier than previously estimated. The scientists noted that the system was losing pressure quite rapidly and had begun pulsing rather than maintaining a steady flow. The pulsing pattern, it was believed, was a clear sign that the geological forces driving the eruption were subsiding.

2016 
By 2016 the mudflow continued with tens of thousands of liters of mud contaminated with heavy metals leaking into rivers. The site has become of interest to "disaster tourists" who visit the area. By now, payments have been made to about 3,300 households representing 95% of those affected, by the Sidoarjo Mudflow Handling Agency, a government-backed taskforce.

Revived controversy 
Out of the three hypotheses on the cause of the Lusi mud volcano, the hydro fracturing hypothesis appeared to be the one most debated. On 23 October 2008 a public relations agency in London, acting for one of the oil well's owners, started to widely publicise what it described as "new facts" on the origin of the mud volcano, which were subsequently presented at an American Association of Petroleum Geologists conference in Cape Town, South Africa on 28 October 2008 (see next section). The assertion of the geologists and drillers from Energi Mega Persada was that "At a recent Geological Society of London Conference, we provided authoritative new facts that make it absolutely clear that drilling could not have been the trigger of LUSI." Other verbal reports of the conference in question indicated that the assertion was by no means accepted uncritically, and that when the novel data is published, it is certain to be scrutinized closely.

In 2009, this well data was finally released and published in the Journal of Marine and Petroleum Geology for the scientific community uses by the geologists and drillers from Energi Mega Persada. It is a common practice in the oil and gas industry to closely guard their drilling and geologic information, and the company involved is no exception. After such release, however, future scientific research on Lusi should have access to a set of credible data and not be as constraint as early authors were with their limited and questionable quality of data to back their claims.

After hearing the (revised) arguments from both sides for the cause of the mud volcano at the American Association of Petroleum Geologists International Convention in Cape Town in October 2008, the vast majority of the conference session audience present (consisting of AAPG oil and gas professionals) voted in favor of the view that the Lusi (Sidoarjo) mudflow had been induced by drilling. On the basis of the arguments presented, 42 out of the 74 scientists came to the conclusion that drilling was entirely responsible, while 13 felt that a combination of drilling and earthquake activity was to blame. Only 3 thought that the earthquake was solely responsible, and 16 geoscientists believed that the evidence was inconclusive.

The report of the debate and its outcomes was published in AAPG Explorer Magazine. The article stated that the voting process was a decision by the moderator and only reflected opinions of a group of individuals in the session room at that time and in no way endorsed by the association. It further cautioned readers not to consider the voting result in any way as a scientific validation.

On the possible trigger of Lusi mud volcano, a group of geologists and drilling engineers from the oil company countered the hydro fracturing hypothesis. They suggested that analysis based on the well data showed that the well was safe and pressure in the well bore was below the critical pressure. It is therefore unlikely that the well was fractured as charged. Their paper also published data and well information for the first time to the scientific communities as opinions and technical papers up to that time lacked accurate well data and were forced to rely on a number of assumptions. However, subsequent studies have refuted the claims made in this paper, and have highlighted that a number of claims made in this study are directly contradicted by the oil company's own well-site reports and documents.

In February 2010, a group led by experts from Britain's Durham University said the new clues bolstered suspicions the catastrophe was caused by human error. In journal Marine and Petroleum Geology, Professor Richard Davies, of the Centre for Research into Earth Energy Systems (CeREES), said that drillers, looking for gas nearby, had made a series of mistakes. They had overestimated the pressure the well could tolerate, and had not placed protective casing around a section of open well. Then, after failing to find any gas, they hauled the drill out while the hole was extremely unstable. By withdrawing the drill, they exposed the wellhole to a "kick" from pressurized water and gas from surrounding rock formations. The result was a volcano-like inflow that the drillers tried in vain to stop.

In the same Marine and Petroleum Geology journal, the group of geologists and drilling engineers refuted the allegation showing that the "kick" maximum pressure were too low to fracture the rock formation. The well pressure analysis based on credible data showed that the well is stronger than the maximum pressure exerted on the well. This implied that the hydro fracturing hypothesis is likely to be incorrect. They further stated that the model developed by Prof. Davies is much too simplistic by not considering all the available dataset and information in its analysis.

The 2010 technical paper in this series of debate presents the first balanced overview on the anatomy of the Lusi mud volcanic system with particular emphasis on the critical uncertainties and their influence on the disaster. It showed the differences in the two hypotheses, the source of water and the current understanding on the subsurface geology below the mud volcano. More geological field studies and analysis based on factual data need to be done before any conclusion can be deduced on what actually caused Lusi mud volcano.

In February 2015, Tingay compiled a new and detailed chronology of the drilling of the Banjar Panji-1 well and the first days of the Sidoarjo mudflow. This chronology is built from daily drilling reports and well-site reports and is the first to highlight and document the numerous inconsistencies between papers and reports. The new chronology highlights that a number of key claims made by Lapindo Brantas are contradicted by their own daily drilling and well-site reports (that are included as an appendix in). These include the claims that losses occurred seven minutes after the earthquake (when drilling data actually suggests losses preceded the earthquake); that losses at total depth occurred immediately after major aftershocks (whereas total losses occurred over 1.5 hours after any aftershocks); that losses at total depth were cured (whereas there are multiple reports of ongoing losses over an 18-hour period whilst pulling out of hole); that the drilling kick was killed within 3 hours (whereas drill pipe pressures fluctuate repeatedly for 24 hours after kick, indicating ongoing cycles of downhole influx and losses); that there is no evidence for downhole losses (that would indicate fracturing or fault reactivation) during the drilling kick (yet mud engineer reports state that over 300 barrels of drilling mud was lost downhole during the kick) and; that there was no connection between the mud flow and wellbore (yet the daily drilling reports state that mud flow activity noticeably decreased when dense drilling mud was pumped down the well during attempts to stop the mudflow).

In July 2013, Lupi et al. proposed that the Lusi mud eruption was the result of a natural event, triggered by a distant earthquake at Yogyakarta two days before. As a result, seismic waves were geometrically focused at the Lusi site leading to mud and CO2 generation and a reactivation of the local Watukosek Fault. According to their hypothesis the fault is linked to a deep hydrothermal system that feeds the eruption.  However, this hypothesis has been heavily criticized due to the original models containing a major error. The original study proposed that a “high velocity layer” focussed earthquake waves, amplifying the effect of the earthquake. However, the “high velocity layer” has since been demonstrated to be a non-existent artefact caused by velocity measurements of the steel casing in the Banjar Panji-1 well, which resulted in the original models assuming that a ‘layer of steel’ existed underground. Lupi et al. have acknowledged this error, but argue in a corrigendum that it makes no difference to their results, as they have proposed in a new velocity model, arguing for the existence of a different high velocity layer at the same depth. There still remains significant doubt about this revised model, as another study indicates that there is no geological or geophysical evidence for any significant domed high velocity layer at the mudflow location that would reflect and amplify seismic waves. A study by Rudolph et al. in 2015 replicated the seismic wave propagation modelling at the Sidoarjo mudflow location using the two competing velocity models, and proposed that the modelling conducted by Lupi et al. exaggerates the effect of the Yogyakarta earthquake at the mudflow location.

In June 2015, Tingay et al. used geochemical data recorded during the drilling of the Banjar Panji-1 well to test the hypothesis that the Yogyakarta earthquake triggered liquefaction and fault reactivation at the mudflow location. Liquefaction of the Kalibeng clays is a crucial component of the earthquake-induced fault reactivation hypothesis, as this process releases gases and fluids that cause the pressure changes proposed to induce fault slip. The drilling geochemical data measured gases produced by subsurface rocks in the Banjar Panji-1 in the weeks before the Yogyakarta earthquake and the days afterwards, and provides the first data to directly examine the downhole effects of the earthquake. The data showed no increased release of gases in the days following the Yogyakarta earthquake, indicating that liquefaction and associated gas-related pressure changes were not triggered by the earthquake. The data also shows that gas increases from downhole formations only commenced when the drilling kick occurred, providing further support that the mudflow was triggered by drilling activities.

Gallery

References

External links

Internet Portal for Lapindo's Victim
Bakrie & Brothers homepage
High format pictures of the mud volcano presented by The Boston Globe
Satellite imagery and Google Earth kml satellite image overlays by CRISP/National University of Singapore
The EGU Newsletters, Issue 19 March 2007: Mud volcano in Java, known locally as 'Lusi' may continue to erupt for months and possibly years. p.5.
 Humanitus Sidoarjo Fund – LUSI Research Library

Mud volcanoes
Volcanoes of East Java
Volcanoes of Java
Disasters in Indonesia
2006 disasters in Indonesia
2006 in Indonesia
Drilling technology
Geology of Indonesia